Dean Robertson (born 11 July 1970) is a Scottish professional golfer.

Robertson was born in Sarnia, Ontario, Canada. He attended Midland College in Texas, United States on a golf scholarship. He won several amateur titles in Scotland and represented Great Britain and Ireland in the Walker Cup before turning professional in 1993.

Robertson gained his European Tour card at his second visit to the qualifying school in 1994. He finished in the top hundred on the European Tour Order of Merit every season from 1995 to 2001, before he began to suffer from clinical depression. He came back in 2004 on a medical exemption, and regained his European Tour card for the following season at qualifying school. However, he was unable to recapture the form from earlier in his career, and last played on the European Tour in 2007.

Robertson's sole European Tour victory came at the 1999 Italian Open. That year he achieved his best year-end ranking on the Order of Merit when he finished in 25th place. Since leaving the tour, he has forged a successful career as a coach. Robertson is currently a high performance golf coach at the University of Stirling.

Amateur wins
1991 Scottish Youths Amateur Open Championship
1992 Scottish Amateur Stroke Play Championship
1993 Scottish Amateur Championship

Professional wins (2)

European Tour wins (1)

Other wins (1)
2006 Scottish PGA Championship

Results in major championships

Note: Robertson only played in The Open Championship.

CUT = missed the half-way cut
"T" = tied

Team appearances
Amateur
Eisenhower Trophy (representing Great Britain & Ireland): 1992
St Andrews Trophy (representing Great Britain & Ireland): 1992 (winners)
Walker Cup (representing Great Britain & Ireland): 1993
European Amateur Team Championship (representing Scotland): 1993

Professional
World Cup (representing Scotland): 1999, 2001

References

External links

Scottish male golfers
European Tour golfers
Sportspeople from Sarnia
1970 births
Living people